Gata de Noche (Night Cat) is the tenth album recorded by the Argentine rock band Vox Dei.
In this album, Ricardo Soulé returned to the band. It was Vox Dei's last album for the first era, until their break-up in 1981.

Background 
In early 1978, Ricardo Soulé returned to Vox Dei, due to lack of success had his solo album Vuelta a casa. Also it's the first and only album recorded for Polydor.

In 1980, Vox Dei prepared another project called "El Cid Campeador según Vox Dei", composed by six movements presented alive, but label Polydor refused the idea.

Ricardo Soulé recorded the idea on his second solo album Romances de Gesta in 1982.

Track listing
All songs written by Ricardo Soulé except where noted.

"Gata de Noche" - 3:38
"Al Rey, a Mí y a Vos" - 3:45
"Puedes Pensar lo que Quieras de Mí" - 5:36
"Piénsalo Antes de Hablar" - 2:55
"El Espejo de tu Cuarto" - 4:18
"Mis Botas de Rock" - 3:16
"Cómo es el Martillo que Quisieras Tener" - 3:14
"No Dejaré que Viva en Mí" (Willy Quiroga) - 5:36
"Fantasmas en Mi Cabeza" (Rubén Basoalto, Willy Quiroga) - 3:43
"Los Nervios y las Luces" (Willy Quiroga) - 3:09

Credits
Band
Willy Quiroga - Vocals, Bass and Electric Piano on "No Dejaré que Viva en Mí".
Rubén Basoalto - Drums, Vocals on "Fantasmas en Mi Cabeza".
Ricardo Soulé - Vocals, Guitar, Harp.

Guest
Oscar "Mono" López - Bass on "No Dejaré que Viva en Mí".

Sources
Vox Dei discography (Spanish)

External links
Vox Dei's official webpage (Spanish)

Vox Dei albums
1978 albums